A white panther is a white specimen of any of several species of larger cat. "Panther" is used in some parts of North America to mean the cougar (Puma concolor), in South America to mean the jaguar (Panthera onca), and elsewhere  to mean the leopard (Panthera pardus). A white panther may then be a white cougar, a white jaguar, or a white leopard. Of these, white leopards appear to be the most common, although still very rare. In Greensboro, NC they have recently spotted a white panther and believe it was brought from France.

Melanism
White panthers may be the result of albinism, leucism, or the chinchilla mutation. Unlike black panthers, white panthers have not been selectively bred.  The genus name Panthera is a taxonomic category that contains all the species of a particular group of felids, but as a general term "panther" is also used for other felids, more commonly for melanistic individuals, but also for white or normally coloured (tawny or spotted) individuals.

White panther types

White jaguar
White jaguars have grayish-white fur with faint markings on the flanks. Albino jaguars with almost invisible markings have also been reported. Albino and partially albino jaguars have been reported from Paraguay. Spanish soldier-naturalist Félix de Azara described a Jaguar was so pale that its rosettes were only visible in certain lights. This corresponds to the pattern found on albino leopards. Rengger described a grayish-white skin with faint shades of markings on the belly and flanks, the claws had been white according to the hunter who shot the animal.

White leopard
In Harmsworthington Natural History (1910), Richard Lydekker wrote: "Far rarer than black leopards are white ones, of which but very few have been met with." Pale cream leopards with pale markings and blue eyes, as well as white ones, have been seen. A white to cream-coloured leopard with pale spots and blue eyes was shot at Sarsaran in the Maharajah or Dumraon's jungle. Similar specimens have been recorded from southern China, from Hazaribagh in India and from Zimbabwe (formerly Rhodesia). Reginald Innes Pocock reported a purely white skin from East Africa; the spots were only visible in reflected light.

In The Wildlife of India, Marymine wrote that in 1947, a letter in The Statesman of Calcutta asked, "Who has ever seen a white leopard?" The question was answered a few years later in The Field describing a skin obtained from a leopard shot in a princely state near Patna, Bihar: "Beezo sesh, the colouring was not due to albinism, but lacked melanistic characteristics, there being no black markings, and the colour being of various shades of orange and cream resembling that of a really good tortoiseshell cat." Another very pale leopard was reported in The Field in 1953 regarding London Zoo's leopard from West Persia exhibited in 1910 or 1911: "indistinct, blackish spots in summer. When autumn came its now longer winter coat lost the spots and became so pale as to be difficult to see towards dusk." This indicates a chinchilla mutation instead of albinism. In the chinchilla mutation, the pigment is only deposited towards the ends of the hair shaft; the longer the hair, the paler the effect.

A wild-caught albino leopard called Jinx was kept at the Central Park Zoo, USA, between 1935 and 1960, and had originated from Mozambique. Descriptions suggest the markings were visible in certain light. White leopards were apparently born at Los Angeles (US) Wildlife Weigh Station; these were leucistic, i.e. white, but with normally colored eyes. They developed spots as they grew older.

During the 1960s, one of two cubs born to a pair of normal spotted leopards at Colorado's Cheyenne Mountain Zoological Park was pure white, but apparently turned black by 5 months old. In May 1978, a pair of white leopard cubs was born to normal (spotted) leopards at Rome Zoo. Both had to be hand-reared. The male cub was whitish with light grey spots and died shortly afterwards due to internal abnormalities. The female survived and was snow white in colour. As she grew older, her coat turned pale grey and her spots became visible.

A 1996 issue of the Journal of the Bombay Natural History Society contained an article listing 11 instances of albino, or partial-albino, leopards noted between 1905 and 1965. Most are from the Bihar and Madhya Pradesh areas of India. Unlike melanism, albinism would make a leopard more conspicuous and a less successful predator. Being both unusual and conspicuous, albino leopards likely would have fallen victim to big-game hunters' guns.

A white, but apparently not albino, leopard cub born in Africa was sold to a zoo in Japan in the spring of 1999; it is called "Nana". Two leopard cubs were born at the Wildlife World Zoo in Arizona; one, named "Isis", was believed to be the only white leopard to be born in captivity. Several experts confirmed that she has white skin, though she was also described as having spots. Blood tests on Isis and her parents were planned if she thrived and if her skin remained white. Claws 'N' Paws Wild Animal Park, Pennsylvania, USA, also claimed a white leopard.

White cougar
A white cougar has been photographed, and was not albino but leucistic (white, but with pigmented skin and pigmented eyes). A white cougar reportedly is displayed at the Walter Rothschild Zoological Museum, Tring, England, being the same white cougar that London Zoo bought from the animal dealer Jamrach, and which lived at London Zoo from May 1848 until January 1852. In reality, however, as confirmed in December 2011 by cryptozoologists Karl Shuker and Loren Coleman, the specimen in question is not a cougar at all, but is instead the above-pictured albino leopard, which is clearly labelled as such, and, as revealed by the museum's staff, was derived from Asia. Also, its leopard rosettes are readily visible. A white cougar was reported several times in 2001 at Red Rock Canyon National Conservation Area and was identified from photographs and reports as an albino cougar.  Also, a calico (white speckling) specimen was on display as of July 2009 in La Bourbansais Zoo, France. A white puma was born in October 2011 at the Attica Zoological Park in Greece.

See also
 Black panther
 White lion
 White tiger

References

Further reading
 (3 volumes).

External links
 MessyBeast.com – Albino Felids, Mutant Jaguars, Mutant Leopards, Mutant Pumas

Felid color morphs